The Washington Township Public School District is a comprehensive community public school district that serves students in kindergarten through twelfth grade from Washington Township, in Gloucester County, New Jersey, United States.

As of the 2018–19 school year, the district, comprised of 11 schools, had an enrollment of 7,202 students and 651.3 classroom teachers (on an FTE basis), for a student–teacher ratio of 11.1:1.

The district is classified by the New Jersey Department of Education as being in District Factor Group "FG", the fourth-highest of eight groupings. District Factor Groups organize districts statewide to allow comparison by common socioeconomic characteristics of the local districts. From lowest socioeconomic status to highest, the categories are A, B, CD, DE, FG, GH, I and J.

Awards and recognition
For the 2005-06 school year, the Washington Township Public School District was recognized with the "Best Practices Award" by the New Jersey Department of Education for its "Creating Proficient Readers and Writers" Professional Development program at Birches Elementary School.

For the 2004-05 school year, both Birches Elementary School and Whitman Elementary School were named as "Star Schools" by the New Jersey Department of Education, the highest state honor that a New Jersey school can achieve.

Schools
Schools in the district (with 2018–19 enrollment data from the National Center for Education Statistics) are:
Preschool
Grenloch Terrace Early Childhood Center (with 339 students; in kindergarten)
Andrea Salstrom, Interim Principal
Elementary schools
Bells Elementary School (429; 1-5)
Ginny Grier, Principal
Birches Elementary School (443; 1-5)
Jessica Rose, Principal
Hurffville Elementary School (492; 1-5)
Naté Dawson, Principal
Thomas Jefferson Elementary School (527; 1-5)
Gary Breen, Principal
Wedgewood Elementary School (460; 1-5)
Charles Zimmerman, Principal
Whitman Elementary School (494; 1-5)
Raymond Anderson, Principal
Middle schools
Bunker Hill Middle School (586; 6-8)
Michael D'Ostilio, Principal
Chestnut Ridge Middle School (696; 6-8)
Theresa Pietrowski, Principal
Orchard Valley Middle School (544; 6-8)
Colleen Cancila, Principal
High school
Washington Township High School with 2,237 students in grades 9 - 12
Jonathan A. Strout, Executive Principal

Administration
Core members of the district's administration are:
Joseph N. Bollendorf, Superintendent
Janine M. Wechter, Business Administrator / Board Secretary

Board of education
The district's board of education, comprised of nine members, sets policy and oversees the fiscal and educational operation of the district through its administration. As a Type II school district, the board's trustees are elected directly by voters to serve three-year terms of office on a staggered basis, with three seats up for election each year held (since 2012) as part of the November general election. The board appoints a superintendent to oversee the day-to-day operation of the district.

References

External links
Washington Township Public Schools

School Data for the Washington Township Public Schools, National Center for Education Statistics

Washington Township, Gloucester County, New Jersey
New Jersey District Factor Group FG
School districts in Gloucester County, New Jersey